Chaetoceros elegans is a species of diatom in the family Chaetocerotaceae. According to Li, 2017, the type locality is Dapeng Bay, Guangdong Province, P. R. China.

References

External links 

 Chaetoceros elegans at WoRMS
 Chaetoceros elegans at NCBI Taxonomy browser
 Chaetoceros elegans at Uniprot taxonomy

Coscinodiscophyceae
Species described in 1895
Protists described in 2017
Biota of Taiwan